August: Osage County is a 2013 American tragicomedy film directed by John Wells. It was written by Tracy Letts and based on his Pulitzer Prize-winning 2007 play of the same name.  It is produced by George Clooney, Grant Heslov, Jean Doumanian, and Steve Traxler.

The film stars an ensemble cast consisting of Meryl Streep, Julia Roberts, Ewan McGregor, Chris Cooper, Abigail Breslin, Benedict Cumberbatch, Juliette Lewis, Margo Martindale, Dermot Mulroney, Julianne Nicholson, and Misty Upham as a dysfunctional family that reunites into the familial house when their patriarch (Sam Shepard) suddenly disappears.

August: Osage County premiered at the Toronto International Film Festival on September 9, 2013 and was released in the United States on December 27, 2013. A modest commercial success, the film received mixed reviews from critics. While much praise was given to the cast, the screenplay was praised by some and seen by others as too dark and lacking in humor. For their performances in the film, Streep and Roberts received Oscar nominations for Best Actress and Best Supporting Actress, respectively.

Plot
The title designates time and location: an unusually hot August in a rural area outside Pawhuska, Oklahoma. Beverly Weston, an alcoholic, once-noted poet, interviews and hires a young Cheyenne woman, Johnna, as a live-in cook and caregiver for his strong-willed and contentious wife Violet, who has oral cancer and an addiction to narcotics. Shortly after this, he disappears from the house, and Violet calls her sister and daughters for support. Her sister Mattie Fae arrives with her husband Charles Aiken. Violet's middle daughter Ivy is single and the only one living locally; Barbara, her oldest, who has inherited her mother's mean streak, arrives from Colorado with her husband Bill and 14-year-old daughter Jean. Barbara and Bill are separated, but they put up a united front for Violet.

After five days, the sheriff arrives with the news that Beverly took his boat out on the lake and has drowned. Youngest daughter Karen arrives with the latest in a string of boyfriends, Steve Huberbrecht, a sleazy Florida businessman whom she introduces as her fiancé. Mattie Fae and Charles's shy, awkward son "Little Charles" misses the funeral because he overslept and is met at the bus station by his father. Charles loves his son, whereas Mattie Fae constantly belittles him. Ivy confides to Barbara that she is in love with her cousin, Little Charles, who plans to move to New York, and she cannot have children because she had a hysterectomy. She feels this is her only chance to finally marry.

The family sits down to dinner after the funeral, fueled by Violet's brutal "truth-telling", which results in Barbara pouncing on her mother. She decides she has had enough of her mother's drug addiction, attacks her, knocks her to the ground, and confiscates all her several kinds of pills. Later, after Violet has had a chance to sober up, she has a tender moment with her daughters and shares a story that demonstrates how cruel her own mother was when she longed for a new pair of cowgirl boots when she was in her early teens. Instead of giving Violet the boots she wanted, her mother gave her a beautifully wrapped box on Christmas morning containing old, filthy men's work boots as a vicious prank.

As Little Charles sings Ivy a song he has written for her, Mattie Fae walks in and berates him. This exhausts Charles's patience with his wife's lack of love and compassion for her own son, and he threatens to leave her if she keeps it up. Mattie Fae subsequently reveals to Barbara, who unintentionally listened in, that long ago she had an affair with Beverly, and Little Charles is in fact their younger half-brother as well as their cousin and that is the true reason why he and Ivy cannot be together.

That evening, Steve and Jean are sharing a joint. Steve comes on to Jean, gets her stoned, asks her to show him her breasts, and starts to assault her. Johnna is woken by their conversation, sees this, and attacks him with a shovel. The commotion wakes up Barbara, Bill, and Karen who rush outside. Barbara confronts Jean and slaps her. This compels Bill to take Jean back to Colorado, leaving Barbara. Karen also leaves with Steve.

Later, Ivy tries to tell her mother about her love for Little Charles. Barbara tries to deflect the admission. Violet tells Ivy that Charles is actually her brother, something Violet knew all along. Ivy leaves and promises to never come back. In the last confrontation between Violet and Barbara, Violet admits she was contacted by Beverly from his motel the week after he had left home but did nothing to help him until after she removed money from the couple's joint safe deposit box. By that time, he had already drowned. This revelation leads Barbara to depart, realizing that her mother is far beyond help. Violet is left with only Johnna. Violet begins dancing to loud music but quickly becomes too upset and goes off to find Johnna for comfort.

Barbara is driving through the plains, stops, gets out of the car, cries, then gets back in the car and follows signage showing highways and number of miles to Wichita, Salina, and Denver.

Cast

 Meryl Streep as Violet Weston, the family matriarch who has cancer; Beverly's wife; Mattie Fae's sister; Barbara, Ivy, and Karen's mother; and Jean's grandmother
 Sam Shepard as Beverly Weston, the family patriarch, Barbara, Ivy and Karen's father, Violet's husband and Jean's grandfather
 Julia Roberts as Barbara Weston-Fordham, Violet and Beverly's oldest daughter, Mattie Fae and Charles' niece, Ivy and Karen's sister and Jean's mother
 Ewan McGregor as Bill Fordham, Barbara's husband and Jean's father
 Abigail Breslin as Jean Fordham, Barbara and Bill's daughter, Ivy and Karen's niece
 Julianne Nicholson as Ivy Weston, Violet and Beverly's second daughter, Mattie Fae and Charles' niece, Barbara and Karen's sister and Jean's aunt
 Juliette Lewis as Karen Weston, Violet and Beverly's youngest daughter, Mattie Fae and Charles' niece, Barbara and Ivy's sister and Jean's aunt
 Dermot Mulroney as Steve Huberbrecht, Karen's fiancé
 Margo Martindale as Mattie Fae Aiken, Violet's younger sister and Barbara, Karen and Ivy's aunt, Charles Sr.'s wife and Charles Jr.'s mother
 Chris Cooper as Charles Aiken Sr., Mattie Fae's husband, Barbara, Karen and Ivy's uncle and Charles Jr.'s father
 Benedict Cumberbatch as Charles "Little Charles" Aiken Jr., Charles and Mattie Fae's son
 Misty Upham as Johnna Monevata, a young Native American hired by Beverly to help Violet in their daily life

Production 

John Wells directed, while George Clooney, Grant Heslov, Jean Doumanian, and Steve Traxler produced the film. Renée Zellweger and Andrea Riseborough were considered for a role. Riseborough was cast but withdrew due to scheduling conflicts. Juliette Lewis replaced her. Chloë Grace Moretz also auditioned for the role of Jean Fordham.

Principal photography took place between October 16 and December 8, 2012, in Bartlesville and Pawhuska, Oklahoma, and Los Angeles.

Release
August: Osage County premiered at the 2013 Toronto International Film Festival on September 9, 2013, before its release in select cities on December 27, 2013, followed by a wide release on January 10, 2014, in the United States. It was also released on January 1, 2014, in Australia. In its limited box-office debut, the film grossed $179,475 from five theaters, a $35,895 per-screen average.

Critical response
August: Osage County received mixed reviews with the entire cast being praised for their performances, especially Streep and Roberts. Rotten Tomatoes sampled 203 and judged 67% of them to be positive, with an average score of 6.40/10. The website's critical consensus reads "The sheer amount of acting going on in August: Osage County threatens to overwhelm, but when the actors involved are as talented as Meryl Streep and Julia Roberts, it's difficult to complain." There was also significant praise for the performances of Chris Cooper, Margo Martindale, Juliette Lewis, and Julianne Nicholson, with some critics stating that this film gives the finest ensemble acting seen in years. On Metacritic the film has a weighted average of 58 out of 100, based on 45 reviews, indicating "mixed or average reviews". Audiences surveyed by CinemaScore gave the film an average grade of "A−" on an A+ to F scale.

Accolades

Soundtrack

Gustavo Santaolalla composed the original music for August: Osage County. The soundtrack was released on January 7, 2014, through Sony Classical.

An album of Santaolalla's score was released digitally on January 3, 2014.

References

External links

 
 
 
 

2013 films
2013 comedy-drama films
American black comedy films
2010s English-language films
Films about dysfunctional families
Incest in film
American films based on plays
Films set in country houses
Films set in Oklahoma
Films shot in Oklahoma
American independent films
Films directed by John Wells
Smokehouse Pictures films
The Weinstein Company films
Films produced by Jean Doumanian
Films produced by Grant Heslov
Films produced by George Clooney
Films scored by Gustavo Santaolalla
2013 independent films
Films about mother–daughter relationships
2010s American films
Tragicomedy films